In medical terminology, disarticulation is the separation of two bones at their joint, either traumatically by way of injury or by a surgeon during arthroplasty or amputation.

See also
 Joint dislocation
 Acrotomophilia
 Apotemnophilia
 Amputation

References

Musculoskeletal disorders
Amputations